Burstwick is a village and civil parish in the Holderness region of the East Riding of Yorkshire, England. It lies on the B1362 road.

History
Burstwick is described as a caput, or principal residence, in the Honour of Holderness, and is listed in the Domesday survey as one of twelve linked manors.

Community

Burstwick is a few miles from the local market town of Hedon and the villages of Keyingham and Thorngumbald.

According to the 2011 UK census, Burstwick parish had a population of 1,924, an increase on the 2001 UK census figure of 1,813.

Burstwick was served from 1854 to 1964 by Burstwick railway station on the Hull and Holderness Railway.

Some low-lying parts of Burstwick were affected by the June 2007 floods which hit most of the county. Several properties were vacated while repair work took place.

Burstwick's church is All Saints', which was designated a Grade I listed building in 1966 and is now recorded in the National Heritage List for England, maintained by Historic England. There is also a Methodist church.

To the north-west of the village is the site of Burstwick Castle which is an ancient scheduled monument.

Amenities

Burstwick contains a public house, the Hare and Hounds, a village shop and post office, and a fish and chip shop, all situated on the main street. Village businesses and services include a petrol station.

The local primary school is Burstwick Community Primary School.

References

External links 

Burstwick Parish Council
Burstwick United - A recent addition to the community after recent events which led to flooding.

Villages in the East Riding of Yorkshire
Holderness
Civil parishes in the East Riding of Yorkshire